.lr is the Internet country code top-level domain (ccTLD) for Liberia.  The registration is limited to those with a local presence and intent to use the domain. 

Registration in LR requires specific second-level domains (COM.LR, ORG.LR, NET.LR, etc.). For the only point of registration of LR domains, see Domain registration website.

Second level domains
 com.lr: Commercial
 edu.lr: Schools granting baccalaureate degrees
 gov.lr: Governmental entities
 org.lr: Not for profit organizations
 net.lr: Network infrastructure (i.e.routers) only

External links
 IANA .lr whois information

Country code top-level domains
Communications in Liberia

sv:Toppdomän#L